The 40th Golden Bell Awards was held on November 12, 2005 at the Taipei County Multi Purpose Hall, Taipei County, Taiwan. The ceremony was broadcast live by EBC.

Winners and nominees
Below is the list of winners and nominees for the main categories.

References

2005
2005 television awards
2005 in Taiwan